Nauru is a small village in the Nanyumbu District of Mtwara Region, Tanzania.

Nauru lies on a path and on two Ruvuma River tributaries. There are almost no paved ways. The village is situated 15 km from the frontier with Mozambique (which is formed by the Ruvuma).

References

External links
 Shosholoza - Greetings from Nauru, Tanzania

Populated places in Mtwara Region